"The Internationale" is an international anthem used by various left-wing groups. It has been a standard of the socialist movement since the late nineteenth century, when the Second International adopted it as its official anthem. The title arises from the "First International", an alliance of workers which held a congress in 1864. The author of the anthem's lyrics, Eugène Pottier, an anarchist, attended this congress. Pottier's text was later set to an original melody composed by Pierre De Geyter, a Marxist.

It is one of the most universally translated anthems in history.

It has been adopted as the anthem of the anarchist, communist, socialist, democratic socialist, and social democratic movements.

French version 

The original French lyrics were written in June 1871 by Eugène Pottier (previously a member of the Paris Commune) and were originally intended to be sung to the tune of "La Marseillaise".
However, the melody to which it is usually sung was composed in 1888 by Pierre De Geyter for the choir "La Lyre des travailleurs" of the French Worker's Party in his hometown of Lille, and the first performed there in July of that year.

There is an early edition of the song, predating the final 1887 version; it was published in 1990 by Robert Brécy.
Contemporary editions published by Boldoduc (Lille) in 1888, by Delory in 1894, and by Lagrange in 1898 are no longer locatable.

Pottiers's lyrics contain one-liners that became very popular and found widespread use as slogans; other lines ("Ni Dieu, ni César, ni tribun") were already well-known in the workers' movement. The success of the song is connected to the stability and widespread popularity of the Second International. Like the lyrics, the music by Degeyter was relatively simple and down to earth, suitable for a workers' audience.

French lyrics, 1887 version

Authorship and copyright
In a successful attempt to save Pierre De Geyter's job as a woodcarver, the 6,000 leaflets printed by Lille printer Boldoduc only mentioned the French version of his family name (Degeyter).
The second edition published by Delory named Pierre's brother Adolphe as the composer.
With neither money nor representation, Pierre De Geyter lost his first lawsuit over this in 1914 and did not gain legal recognition of authorship until 1922 when he was 74.
His brother had in the meantime died by suicide in 1916, leaving a note to Pierre explaining the fraud and stating that Delory had manipulated him into claiming authorship; and Delory had inscribed on Adolphe's tombstone "Ici repose Adolphe Degeyter, l'auteur de L'Internationale".
Despite this dying declaration, historians in the 1960s such as Daniel Ligou were still contending that Adolphe was the author.

East Germany paid Montana Edition 20,000 DM every year for its rights to play the music. Pierre De Geyter died in 1932, causing the copyrights to expire in 2002. Luckhardt's German text is the public domain since 1984.

As the "Internationale" music was published before 1 July 1909 outside the United States, it is in the public domain in the United States. As of 2013, Pierre De Geyter's music is also in the public domain in countries and areas whose copyright durations are authors' lifetime plus 80 years or less. Due to France's wartime copyright extensions (prorogations de Guerre), SACEM claimed that the music was still copyrighted in France until October 2014. Because of this, the "Internationale" is also in the public domain within France.

As Eugène Pottier died in 1887, his original French lyrics are in the public domain. Gustave Delory once acquired the copyright of his lyrics through the songwriter G. B. Clement having bought it from Pottier's widow.

Anthem of the Soviet Union 
The Russian version was initially translated by Arkady Kots in 1902 and printed in London in Zhizn, a Russian émigré magazine. The first Russian version consisted of three stanzas (as opposed to six stanzas in the original French lyrics and based on stanzas 1, 2, and 6) and the refrain. After the Bolshevik Revolution in Russia, the text was slightly re-worded to get rid of "now useless" future tenses – particularly the refrain was reworded (the future tense was replaced by the present, and the first person plural possessive pronoun was introduced). In 1918, the chief editor of Izvestia, Yuri Steklov, appealed to Russian writers to translate the other three stanzas and in the end, the song was expanded into six stanzas.

The full song is as follows:

Toscanini and Hymn of the Nations 
The change of the Soviet Union's national anthem from "The Internationale" to the "State Anthem of the USSR" was a factor in the production of the 1944 movie Hymn of the Nations, which made use of an orchestration of "The Internationale" that Arturo Toscanini had already done the year before for a 1943-11-07 NBC radio broadcast commemorating the twenty-sixth anniversary of the October Revolution.
It was incorporated into Verdi's Inno delle nazioni alongside the national anthems of the United Kingdom (already in the original) and the United States (incorporated by Toscanini for a prior radio broadcast of the Inno in January of that year) to signify the side of the Allies during World War Two.

Toscanini's son Walter remarked that an Italian audience for the movie would see the significance of Arturo being willing to play these anthems and unwilling to play Giovinezza and the Marcia Reale because of his anti-Fascist political views.
Alexandr Hackenschmied, the film's director, expressed his view that the song was "ormai archeologico" (nearly archaeological), but this was a countered in a letter by Walter Toscanini to Giuseppe Antonio Borgese, rejecting the objections of Borgese, Hackenschmied, and indeed the Office of War Information.
At the time, Walter stated that he believed that "The Internationale" had widespread relevance across Europe, and in 1966 he recounted in correspondence that the OWI had "panicked" when it had learned of the Soviet Union's plans, but Arturo had issued an ultimatum that if "The Internationale", "l'inno di tutte le glebe ed i lavoratori di tutto il mondo" (the anthem of the working classes of the whole world) was not included, that if the already done orchestration and performance were not used as-is, then they should forget about distributing the film entirely.

The inclusion of "The Internationale" in the Toscanini's minds was not simply for the sake of a Soviet Union audience, but because of its relevance to all countries of the world.
Although Walter did not consider "The Internationale" to be "good music", he considered it to be (as he stated to the OWI) "more than the hymn of a nation or a party" and "an idea of brotherhood".

It would have been expensive to re-record a new performance of the Inno without "The Internationale", and it remained in the movie as originally released.
Some time during the McCarthy Era, however, it was edited out of re-released copies, and remained so until a 1988 Library of Congress release on video, which restored  "The Internationale" to the movie.

Winston Churchill and National Anthems of the Allies 
A similar situation had occurred earlier in the War with the BBC's popular weekly Sunday evening radio broadcast, preceding the Nine O'Clock News, titled National Anthems of the Allies, whose playlist was all of the national anthems of the countries allied with the United Kingdom, the list growing with each country that Germany invaded.
After the Germans began their invasion of the Soviet Union on 22 June 1941 (Operation Barbarossa), it was fully expected that "The Internationale", as the anthem of the Soviet Union, would be included in the playlist that day; but to people's surprise it was not, neither that week nor the week after. Winston Churchill, a staunch opponent of communism, had immediately sent word to the BBC via Anthony Eden that "The PM has issued an instruction to the Ministry of Information that the Internationale is on no account to be played by the B.B.C." (emphasis in the original).

Newspapers such as the Daily Express and Daily Mail were sharply critical of the Foreign Office, and questions were asked in the House of Commons.
Ambassador Ivan Maisky recorded in his diary a conversation with Duff Cooper on 1941-07-11 where Cooper asked him if the music played after Vyacheslav Molotov's speech on 1941-06-22 would be acceptable to the Soviet Union, and he replied that it would not be.
(The music was Tchaikovsky's 1812 Overture.)
On the evening of 1941-07-13, the BBC instead played, in Maisky's words, "a very beautiful but little-known Soviet song", which he described as demonstrating "the British Government's cowardice and foolishness".
Rather than risk offending the Soviet Union by continuing to pointedly refuse to play its national anthem in a radio programme entitled National Anthems, the BBC discontinued the programme.
Six months later on 1942-01-22 Churchill relented and lifted the prohibition.

This relaxation enabled "The Internationale" to be used in wartime broadcasts and films, and at public occasions, thereafter.
The BBC's 1943 Salute to the Red Army had a mass performance of "The Internationale" at the Royal Albert Hall by the choir of the Royal Choral Society, the BBC Symphony Orchestra, the London Philharmonic Orchestra, and military bands, in front of the flag of the Soviet Union and following a speech by Anthony Eden.
The day before, which was Red Army Day, troops and the audience had sung "The Internationale" to the Lord Mayor of Bristol.
The 1944 movie Tawny Pipit depicted schoolchildren in the fictional village of Lipton Lea welcoming the character Olga Boclova (based upon Ludmilla Pavlichenko) to their town by singing "The Internationale".

Soviet cinema and theatre 
Dmitry Shostakovich used "The Internationale" twice for the movie soundtrack to the 1936 Soviet movie Girl Friends, once performed by a military-style band when a group of women are preparing for war, and a second time as a solo performance on a theremin.

Nikolai Evreinov's 1920 The Storming of the Winter Palace used both "The Internationale" and "La Marseillaise" symbolically in opposition to each other, with the former sung by the "Red platform" proletariat side and the latter sung by the "White platform" government side, the former starting weakly and in disarray but gradually becoming organised and drowning out the latter.

China 
Qu Qiubai revised the translation of the lyrics into Chinese after having attended the Fourth Conference of Comintern in November 1921 and having not been able to join in the spontaneous singing by attendees there of "The Internationale" in their various home languages with their own Chinese rendition because the Chinese attendees did not have a good one.
He proceeded, according to the political memoirs of his contemporaries, in 1923 to re-translate the lyrics from the original French at the organ in his cousin's home in Beijing, publishing them in New Youth, a journal that he was the editor-in-chief of.

This has become part of the cultural narrative of Qu's life, including in a 2001 television dramatisation of events, The Sun Rises from the East, where Qu is depicted as explaining to Cai Hesen that he (Qu) did not translate the song's title because he wished to make the Chinese version, which used a phonetic rendering of the French name using Chinese words "yingtenaixiongnaier", accessible to a multi-lingual non-Chinese-speaking audience.
The television dramatisation included excerpts from the movie Lenin in October, a popular movie in China during the time of Mao with scenes that were set to "The Internationale".

Lenin in October was one of several movies from Soviet cinema translated into Chinese in the 1950s that led to the widespread popularity of "The Internationale" in the early years of the PRC.
Others include Lenin in 1918, a 1939 movie which came to China in 1951, with "The Internationale" abruptly terminated at the point in the movie that Lenin is shot by an assassin; and the 1952 The Unforgettable 1919 which came to China that same year and used "The Internationale" for a mass rally scene involving Joseph Stalin.

Chinese movies about martyrs to the CCP cause would begin to incorporate the song into pivotal scenes later in the 1950s, this use peaking in the 1960s with inclusion into such movies as the 1965 Living Forever in Burning Flames depicting the execution of Jiang Jie.
In the 1956 movie Mother, the character Lao Deng, a local revolutionary leader, is depicted singing "The Internationale" on the way to his execution, and in the 1960 A Revolutionary Family, the son of the protagonist (in chorus with his fellow prisoners) also sings "The Internationale" on the way to his execution. It would become a leitmotif of Chinese Revolutionary (model) cinema.

Political memoirs of Li Dazhao's daughter Li Xinghua recount his explaining the lyrics of the song to her, he having encountered it on his travels with Qu in 1923 and during his visit to Moscow the following year.
He also encouraged people to sing it during socialist activism training sessions in 1925 and 1926.
As with Qu, the song forms part of the cultural narrative of his life, it being the widely accepted account of his execution in 1927 that he sang the song in the last moments of his life.

As with Qu and Li, the song is found in many places in political histories of CCP leaders and martyrs to its cause, symbolising their socialist ideals, including Zhu De, Zhou Enlai, and Deng Xiaoping.
It has also seen continued, and sometimes contradictory, uses over the decades as politics in China have changed, such as (for one example) Chen Yun's use in the 1960s to justify a new agricultural land allocation policy.
It has maintained its status as a de facto CCP anthem, and its continued relevance over the decades can be seen in its inclusion in all three of the 1964 The East Is Red, the 1984 The Song of the Chinese Revolution, and the 2009 The Road to Prosperity.

While the song has a wide influence as an adjunct of official ideology, it has also been used in counter-cultural movements, such as the demonstrators in the 1989 Tiananmen Square protests singing it during their final retreat.
Barbara Mittler maintains that this dual use of "The Internationale" by the government and by people demonstrating against it disproves any hypothesis that "a certain type of music 'depicts' a certain social environment".

Timothy Garton Ash related a more pronounced role reversal in the August 1980 negotiations surrounding the creation of Solidarity, describing in his 1983 book The Polish Revolution striking workers watching the plenary of the ruling Polish United Workers' Party on television.
In response to the government officials singing "The Internationale" on screen, a Party ritual, workers spontaneously broke into a recital of the national anthem of Poland, which Ash characterised as "'Arise ye prisoners of want' pipes the box; 'Poland is not yet lost' thunders the hall."

"The Internationale" continues to be popular with 21st century Chinese audiences, as exemplified by its reception by audience when sung at the second curtain call of the "Shocking" concert of Liu Han, Liao Changyong, and Mo Hualun.

Qu was hired as a translator for students at the Communist University of the Toilers of the East in Moscow, where he met Xiao San in 1922, who had newly arrived from France.
There, Xiao was drawn into the performing arts as a vehicle for revolutionary messages and, in conjunction with other students, translated "The Internationale" and several Soviet songs from the original French and Russian into Chinese, separately from Qu's work in Beijing in 1923.
Xiao re-worked his translation in 1939, adding to it an explanatory history.
Ironically, the translation in the television dramatisation The Sun Rises from the East that is recited by the character of Qu, is not in reality Qu's translation at all, but is the 1949 official approved translation based upon Xiao's, that is additionally credited to Zheng Zhenduo.

The 2004 movie My Years in France, a biopic of Deng Xiaoping, re-framed this history into a dramatic scene, set in 1920s Paris before Xiao leaves for Moscow, in which Zhou Enlai, Liu Qingyang, Zhang Shenfu, and others climb to the top of Notre Dame to sing "The Internationale" to the accompaniment of its bell Emmanuel, and the character of Xiao resolves at that point, instead, to translate the song into Chinese.

Other translations
One of the earliest translations of the song dates from around 1900, when Dutch communist poet Henriette Roland Holst translated it into Dutch, with "Ontwaakt, verworpenen der aarde" ("Wake up, all who are cast away"). The American English version by Charless Kerr, and anonymous British English and Rumanian versions, were made around the same time. By the time of the 1910 International Socialist Congress in Copenhagen, versions had appeared in 18 different languages, including a Danish one by A. C. Meyer, which was sung at the end of a cantata by 500 singers.

The traditional UK version of "The Internationale" is usually sung in three verses, while the American version, written by Charles Hope Kerr with five verses, is usually sung in two. The American version is sometimes sung with the phrase "the internationale", "the international soviet", or "the international union" in place of "the international working class". In modern usage, the American version also often uses "their" instead of "his" in "Let each stand in his place", and "free" instead of "be" in "Shall be the Human race."

Pete Seeger asked Billy Bragg to sing "The Internationale" with him at the Vancouver Folk Festival in 1989. Bragg thought the traditional English lyrics were archaic and unsingable (Scottish musician Dick Gaughan and former Labour MP Tony Benn disagreed), and composed a new set of lyrics. The recording was released on his album The Internationale along with reworkings of other socialist songs.

The first line of the song has been translated differently into various languages.
The original French "debout" means "stand up", and this is retained in the Russian translation and several English ones, but the German translation is "aufwachen" meaning "wake up"/"arise" and this connotation of sleeping can also be found in English versions that read "Arise ye workers from your slumber".

The existence of multiple translations led the song to gain pride of place in the official songbook of the International Brigades in the Spanish Civil War, as it was a song that volunteers from many countries could all sing together, each in their own languages but all to the same tune.

Allusions in other works
The "anthem" in the early pages of George Orwell's Animal Farm has been described as a "parody" or a "reconfiguration" of "The Internationale"; Orwell's text states (as a "humorous introduction") that it was sung as "between Clementine and La Cucaracha", in reference to "Oh My Darling, Clementine" and "La Cucaracha".

William Carlos Williams' poem Choral: The Pink Church alludes to the lyrics of "The Internationale" in order to symbolise Communism, the poem otherwise barely mentioning Communism directly, Williams himself claiming to be "a pink [...] not a red" in a letter discussing the poem.

One of Aleksandr Lebedev-Frontov's most famous works, which hung in the headquarters of the National Bolshevik Party, is a poster of the French Fantomas aiming a pistol at the viewer, subtitled with the first line of the Russian version of "The Internationale".

Translations into other languages

English translations
 
Pete Seeger asked Billy Bragg to sing "The Internationale" with him at the Vancouver Folk Festival in 1989. Bragg thought the traditional English lyrics were archaic and unsingable (Scottish musician Dick Gaughan and former Labour MP Tony Benn disagreed), and composed a new set of lyrics. The recording was released on his album The Internationale along with reworkings of other socialist songs.

Bengali translation 
"The Internationale" was translated to Bengali by Hemanga Biswas and Mohit Banerji. It was subsequently adopted by West Bengal's Left Front.

Chinese translations 

In addition to the Mandarin version, "The Internationale" also has Cantonese and Taiwanese Hokkien versions, occasionally used by communists or leftists in Hong Kong and Taiwan. The word "Internationale" is not translated in either version. There also exists an Uyghur version, Tibetan version and Mongolian version translated from the Chinese version which is used for ethnic minorities of China.

Filipino translation
There were three Filipino versions of the song. The first was composed by Juan Feleo of the Partido Komunista ng Pilipinas-1930 under the title "Pandaigdigang Awit ng Manggagawa" (The International Worker's Anthem) which was translated from the English version. The second version was a retranslation of the first two stanzas on the basis of the French original by the Communist Party of the Philippines. The third version, which introduced the third stanza, was derived from both Chinese and French versions and translated by Jose Maria Sison, the CPP's founding chairman.

German translations
The original French text has six stanzas. The best-known and still widespread German-language adaptation was created by Emil Luckhardt (1880-1914) in 1910. His version is merely based on the original French text and is limited to a translation of the first two stanzas and the last stanza of the French song that is somewhat weakened and romanticised in its radicalism.

Apart from Luckhardt's version, there are at least seven other lesser-known German text variants - each relating to specific historical situations or ideologically divergent socialist, communist and anarchist alignments. In addition to the Luckhardt version mentioned above, there is a version penned by Franz Diederich (1908) and by Sigmar Mehring. In 1919 a version was written by Erich Mühsam and in 1937 during the Spanish Civil War another one for the German Thälmann Brigade (cf. also International Brigades) by Erich Weinert.

Korean translation 
The Internationale is used in both Koreas, though it is more commonly used in the North. The DPRK uses "The Internationale" in propaganda and music, Party Congresses, and even sports events. In the South, the Internationale has been used by labour unions and protestors but remains less celebrated. As the northern lyrics are often considered too archaic and Communistic by southerners, there are 2 presently used versions of the Korean Internationale – the traditional lyrics, and the newer lyrics. While the northern lyrics borrow heavily from the Russian Internationale, the southern lyrics are completely original. In addition, the Southern refrain is longer and does not repeat.

Persian translation 
For the first time, Abolqasem Lahouti, an Iranian poet and songwriter, translated and standardized this hymn into Persian. It was used as the official anthem of the short lived Persian Socialist Soviet Republic and one of the main anthems of the communist Tudeh Party of Iran.

Portuguese translation 
Originally translated to Iberian Portuguese by Neno Vasco in 1909 from the French version, a very similar version in Brazilian Portuguese was wildly disseminated during the general strike of 1917 by anarchists and anarcho-syndicalists.  The main difference between the two versions is that in the third verse the Brazilian version goes "Lords, bosses, supreme chiefs" (Senhores, Patrões, chefes supremos) while the European version is "Messiah, God, supreme chiefs" (Messias, Deus, chefes supremos).

Vietnamese translation 
"The Internationale" was first translated into Vietnamese by the founder of the Communist Party of Vietnam and the first President of modern Vietnam, Ho Chi Minh, under the pseudonym "Nguyễn Ái Quốc". But the current lyrics in Vietnamese were translated by the 1st and 2nd General Secretaries of the Communist Party of Vietnam, Trần Phú and Lê Hồng Phong. It was subsequently adopted by the Communist Party of Vietnam.

Audio files

References

Notes

Bibliography

Further reading

External links 
  (on-line support material for )
  — a British Pathé newsreel including footage of the playing of "The Internationale", excerpts from Eden's speech, and other celebrations around the UK 
Downloadable recordings in more than 40 languages

Socialist International
Socialist symbols
Russian Revolution
Russian anthems
Communist Party of the Soviet Union
Anti-fascist music
Macaronic songs
Historical national anthems
National symbols of the Soviet Union
Political party songs
Songs of the Spanish Civil War
Protest songs
Songs critical of religion
1871 songs
Symbols of communism
Chinese patriotic songs
Maoist China propaganda songs
French songs
Songs based on poems
Anthems of organizations
Songs about revolutions
Billy Bragg songs
Communist songs
Socialist songs